In set theory, the intersection of two sets  and  denoted by  is the set containing all elements of  that also belong to  or equivalently, all elements of  that also belong to

Notation and terminology 

Intersection is written using the symbol "" between the terms; that is, in infix notation. For example:

The intersection of more than two sets (generalized intersection) can be written as:

which is similar to capital-sigma notation. 

For an explanation of the symbols used in this article, refer to the table of mathematical symbols.

Definition

In symbols:

For example:
 The intersection of the sets {1, 2, 3} and {2, 3, 4} is {2, 3}.

Intersecting and disjoint sets

Algebraic properties 

Binary intersection is an associative operation; that is, for any sets  and  one has

Intersection is also commutative. That is, for any  and  one has
The intersection of any set with the empty set results in the empty set; that is, that for any set ,

Also, the intersection operation is idempotent; that is, any set  satisfies that . All these properties follow from analogous facts about logical conjunction.

Intersection distributes over union and union distributes over intersection. That is, for any sets  and  one has

Arbitrary intersections

The most general notion is the intersection of an arbitrary  collection of sets.
In symbols:

The notation for this last concept can vary considerably. Set theorists will sometimes write "", while others will instead write "".
The latter notation can be generalized to "", which refers to the intersection of the collection 

In the case that the index set  is the set of natural numbers, notation analogous to that of an infinite product may be seen:

When formatting is difficult, this can also be written "".  This last example, an intersection of countably many sets, is actually very common; for an example, see the article on σ-algebras.

Nullary intersection

Note that in the previous section, we excluded the case where  was the empty set. The reason is as follows: The intersection of the collection  is defined as the set (see set-builder notation)

If  is empty, there are no sets  in  so the question becomes "which 's satisfy the stated condition?" The answer seems to be . When  is empty, the condition given above is an example of a vacuous truth. So the intersection of the empty family should be the universal set (the identity element for the operation of intersection),
but in standard (ZF) set theory, the universal set does not exist.

See also

References

Further reading

External links

 

Basic concepts in set theory
Operations on sets
Intersection